This is a list of Trivial Pursuit editions and their trivia categories.

Master game sets and subsidiary card sets
 Trivial Pursuit Master Game - Genus Edition (Original) (1981, Master Game)

 Trivial Pursuit - All-Star Sports Edition (1983, Subsidiary Card Set)

 Trivial Pursuit Master Game - Baby Boomer Edition (1983, Subsidiary Card Set)

 Trivial Pursuit Master Game - Silver Screen Edition (1983, Subsidiary Card Set)

 Trivial Pursuit Master Game - Genus II Edition (1984, Subsidiary Card Set)

 Trivial Pursuit Master Game - Young Players Edition (1984, released in both Master Game and Subsidiary Card Set editions)

 Trivial Pursuit - RPM Edition (1985, Subsidiary Card Set, UK version also released with different box art, unknown if questions differ from US version)

 Trivial Pursuit - Welcome to America Edition (1985, Subsidiary Card Set) 

 Trivial Pursuit Master Game - Walt Disney Family Edition (1985, Subsidiary Card Set)

 Trivial Pursuit Featuring the Magic of Disney - Family Edition (1986, partial re-release of 1985 edition in both Master Game and Subsidiary Card Set editions)

 Trivial Pursuit Master Game - The 1960s (1986, released in both Master Game and Subsidiary Card Set editions)

 Trivial Pursuit for Juniors - First Edition (1987, Master Game) 

 Trivial Pursuit Master Game - A Genus Edition Volume II (1987) - Coleco Games

 Trivial Pursuit Master Game - A Genus Edition Volume II (1987, revised 1989) - Parker Brothers

 Trivial Pursuit Master Game - The Vintage Years (1989, released in both Master Game and Subsidiary Card Set editions)

 Trivial Pursuit Master Game - The 1980s (1989, released in both Master Game and Subsidiary Card Set editions)

 Trivial Pursuit for Juniors - Second Edition (1990)

 Trivial Pursuit Master Game - TV Edition (1991, released in both Master Game and Subsidiary Card Set editions)

 The Year in Review 1992 (1992, Subsidiary Card Set)

 Trivial Pursuit 10th Anniversary (1992, Master Game) 

 Family Edition (1992)

 Trivial Pursuit All American Edition Master Game (1993)

 Trivial Pursuit Game Show Edition (1993, Subsidiary Card Set) 

 The Year in Review 1993 (1994, Subsidiary Card Set)

 Genus III (1994)

 Junior – Third Edition (1994) 
 Genus IV (1996)

 Junior – Fourth Edition (1996) 

 Star Wars Classic Trilogy Collector's Edition (1997)

 Star Wars Episode I (1998) 

 Millennium  (1998)

 Know-it-All (1998, Subsidiary Card Set) - Winning Moves

The following three releases reportedly have some questions unique to the region.
 Know-It-All New England (Winning Moves – very hard to find)
 Know-It-All New York (Winning Moves – very hard to find)
 Know-It-All Chicago (Winning Moves – very hard to find)
 Warner Bros (1999)
In addition to questions about Warner Bros movies and TV shows (including Looney Tunes/Merrie Melodies and other Warner Bros. Animation projects), it also includes questions based on other Time Warner properties, including DC Comics, Hanna-Barbera, Cartoon Network, MAD Magazine, and assorted MGM properties owned via Turner Entertainment Co. (including Tom & Jerry and The Wizard of Oz).

This edition also contains a seventh category, "Picture Cards", on a separate set of cards with youth questions based on WB cartoons.
 Biographies (2000)

 Genus V (2000)

 Know-It All TP (2000, Subsidiary Card Set, duplicates questions from Winning Moves edition but also includes 32 additional cards)
 Junior – Fifth Edition (2001, 1,200 questions, no categories) 

 20th Anniversary (2002)

 Disney Animated Picture (2002)

 Lord of the Rings Movie Trilogy Edition (2003)

Rather than colors, this edition's categories are indicated with icons: leaf, badge, tree, ring, sword, ⊕
 Volume 6 (2003)

 Globe Trotter (2003, Master Game, UK Release)

 Pop Culture (2003)

 90s (in metal box) (2004)

 Book Lover's Edition (2004)

 Trivial Pursuit for Kids – Volume 6 (2004) 

 Trivial Pursuit for Kids Nickelodeon Edition (2005, Master Game) 
 Disney Edition (2005) 

 Pop Culture 2 (2006)

 Totally '80s (2006)

 Trivial Pursuit – Greatest Hits (80s, 90s & Pop Culture) (2007) 

 Trivial Pursuit 25th Silver Anniversary Edition (2008)

 Trivial Pursuit - Family '08 (2008)

 Trivial Pursuit: The Beatles Collector's Edition (2009) 

 Trivial Pursuit Team (2009) 
 Trivial Pursuit Bet You Know It (2010) 
 Trivial Pursuit Master Edition I (2010) 
 Trivial Pursuit - The Rolling Stones (2010) 
 Trivial Pursuit - Disney For All (2011) 
 Trivial Pursuit - Classic Rock (2011, Master Game) 

 Trivial Pursuit - Power Rangers 20th Anniversary Edition (2013) 

 Trivial Pursuit World of Warcraft Edition (2013, Master Game) 

 Trivial Pursuit Party (2013) 

 Trivial Pursuit 2000s (2016)

 Trivial Pursuit: Classic Edition (2016)

 Trivial Pursuit: World of Harry Potter Ultimate Edition (2018)

Trivial Pursuit: 40th Anniversary Ruby Edition (2019) - Includes Remember When? questions from 1979 to 2018

 Trivial Pursuit Back to the 80s (2019, Master Game)

 Trivial Pursuit: Decades – 2010 to 2020 (2021)

 Trivial Pursuit: Dungeons & Dragons Ultimate Edition (2022)

 Trivial Pursuit: Horror Ultimate Edition (2020)

Mini packs
Trivial Pursuit mini packs contain 120 cards with 720 questions in the standard six-color format but no categories.
 Trivial Pursuit Mini Pack - Sports (1987) 
 Trivial Pursuit Mini Pack - Rock & Pop (1987) 
 Trivial Pursuit Mini Pack - The Good Life (1987) 
 Trivial Pursuit Mini Pack - War & Victory (1987) 
 Trivial Pursuit Mini Pack - Flicks (1989) 
 Trivial Pursuit Mini Pack - TV (1989) 
 Trivial Pursuit Mini Pack - Wild Card (1989) 
 Trivial Pursuit Mini Pack - Country Music (1993)

International editions

 Trivial Pursuit - All-Star Sports Edition - Canadian Version (1981) 

 Trivial Pursuit - Genus II Edition - Canadian Version (1984) 
 The Good Life Travel card set (1987) (Canada)
 War & Victory Travel card set (1987) (Canada)
 Bicentennial Edition (1987) (Australia) (Master game set - released in time for the Bicentennial in 1988)
 Trivial Pursuit - RPM Edition Volume II (1989, Subsidiary Card Set)

 Trivial Pursuit - Édition France (1989) -  In French, with all questions pertaining to France to honor the bicentennial of the storming of the Bastille 
All Genus games of any variety are constantly being updated.

Atypical editions/rules

 Trivial Pursuit Pocket Player Set - Boob Tube (1987)
The Boob Tube edition has no categories, but the cards still have six questions, each with the usual colors.
 Trivial Pursuit Pocket Player Set - TP's People (1987)
The TP's people edition has no categories, but the cards still have six questions, each with the usual colors.
 Picture Pursuit  (1994)

 In Pursuit (2001)
This variant on the game is more team-oriented, with different "totems" to represent who leads and follows; team members can challenge the other team for control, or alternate "overthrow" the leader to assume that role.

Bite Sized 
Also sometime referred to as  Winning Moves, bite size editions focus on a single area of knowledge. Each edition comes with a dice (often stylised) and 600 questions (Some editions also come with a cheese wheel). They can be used either as an addition to the main game in the same way as Mini Packs or as a stand-alone game.

In the stand-alone version the object is to win six cards.

Editions:
  007 

  The Beatles 
  Big Bang Theory 

  Bobs Burgers (2020)

  Celebrity 

  Doctor Who  

  Entertainment 

  Family 

 Food and Drink 

  Friends (The TV Series) 

  Genus (2003) 

 Girls Vs Guys (2007)
Girls

Guys

 The Golden Girls 
  Harry Potter 
 Set 1

 Set 2
 Italian Football Teams
 Barcelona 
 Inter 
 Juventus 
  London Games 2012 
 Lord of the Rings 
 Music

 Nightmare Before Christmas, The (2022)

 Party Quiz (German) 
 Polski Sport (Polish) 
 Quality Street
  Rick and Morty 
 Shakespeare 
  Sports and Games 

  Star Wars 

  Walking Dead 
  Wildlife 

  World Football 

  The World of Dinosaurs

Multimedia editions
 Star Trek Edition VCR Game (1995) 
 Millennium CD-ROM (1998)
 Pop Culture DVD (2003)
 Lord of the Rings DVD (2004) 
 Saturday Night Live DVD (2004)

 Unhinged (Xbox, PS2) (2004) 
 Star Wars Saga 2 DVD (2005)
 Pop Culture DVD 2 (2005)
 DVD for Kids (2006-2012)
 Trivial Pursuit Digital Choice (2008)
 Trivial Pursuit (Wii, PS2, PS3, Xbox 360) (2009)
 Trivial Pursuit (iPhone, iPod Touch) (2009)
 Doctor Who Trivial Pursuit (board game) (2013)
 Trivial Pursuit Live! (PlayStation 4, Xbox One) (2015)

References

Trivial Pursuit